Brad Nelson Karp is an American computer scientist, specializing in computer networks. He obtained his bachelor's degree from Yale University in 1992 and got his master's and Ph.D. from Harvard University in 1995 and 2000 respectively, under the supervision of H. T. Kung. Later on he became a staff scientist at the Center for Internet Research and at the International Computer Science Institute in Berkeley, California where he worked until 2002. 
After working as a senior staff researcher at Intel Research of Pittsburgh and as an adjunct assistant professor at Carnegie Mellon University, he moved in 2005 to University College London, where he is now a reader. In 2005, he was a winner of the Royal Society Wolfson Research Merit Award.

References

External links
Google scholar profile
Brad Karp

Living people
20th-century births
American computer scientists
Yale University alumni
Harvard University alumni
Carnegie Mellon University faculty
Academics of University College London
Royal Society Wolfson Research Merit Award holders
Year of birth missing (living people)